A total lunar eclipse will take place on August 28, 2072.

Visibility
It will be completely visible over North America, Europe, Africa, Asia, and Australia, seen rising over Europe, Africa, and Asia and setting over North America. In South America the eclipse will be not visible over invisible.

Related lunar eclipses

Inex 
 Preceded: Lunar eclipse of September 19, 2043

 Followed: Lunar eclipse of August 9, 2101

Tritos 
 Preceded: Lunar eclipse of September 29, 2061

 Followed: Lunar eclipse of July 29, 2083

Tzolkinex 
 Preceded: Lunar eclipse of July 17, 2065

 Followed: Lunar eclipse of October 10, 2079

Triad 
 Preceded: Lunar eclipse of October 28, 1985

 Followed: Lunar eclipse of June 30, 2159

Octon (1/5 of Metonic Cycle) 
 Preceded: Lunar eclipse of November 9, 2068

 Followed: Lunar eclipse of June 17, 2076

Related lunar eclipses

Saros series 

It last occurred on August 18, 2054 and will next occur on September 8, 2090.

This is the 40th member of Lunar Saros 129. The previous event was the August 2036 lunar eclipse. The next event is the August 2072 lunar eclipse. Lunar Saros 129 contains 11 total lunar eclipses between 1910 and 2090. Solar Saros 136 interleaves with this lunar saros with an event occurring every 9 years 5 days alternating between each saros series.

Half-Saros cycle
A lunar eclipse will be preceded and followed by solar eclipses by 9 years and 5.5 days (a half saros). This lunar eclipse is related to two total solar eclipses of Solar Saros 136.

See also 
List of lunar eclipses and List of 21st-century lunar eclipses

Notes

External links 
 

2072-08
2072-08
2072 in science